Chew Lips was an English dance-pop trio, formed in spring of 2008. It consisted of singer 'Tigs' and multi-instrumentalists James Watkins and Will Sanderson

Career

2008–2009: First steps
Formed in London as a three piece band in the summer of 2008, Huerta, Watkins and Sanderson armed themselves with a slew of electro-pop hooks and set about establishing Chew Lips as one of the most exciting new acts in the capital.

With Tigs developing into a charismatic whirlwind of a front woman who it was impossible to take your eyes off, Chew Lips increasingly compelling live performances grabbed the attention of uber-cool French label Kitsuné who insisted on putting out the band's debut single, "Solo".

Released in March 2009, "Solo" sold out almost instantly, causing a storm in the blogosphere and beyond, with Pitchfork calling the track "….classic, pristine," and The Fly magazine labelling it "one of the most magnificent debuts of the year".

2009–2010: Second Kitsuné single and Unicorn

A relentless schedule of touring followed into 2009 as Chew Lips honed their sound into a sleek, sophisticated beast.

Kitsuné released a second sold out single, "Salt Air" in July 2009 – NME called it "an addictive slice of heart-wrenching disco-pop" – before the band begun work in summer '09 on their full-length debut with Bat For Lashes collaborator David Kosten.

The fruits of their labour came with the self-released album Unicorn in January 2010, such a giant leap forward for their sound that they were confident enough to leave off both of the previous singles. It was easy to see why – in the likes of "Play Together", "Karen" and "Slick", they had outdone themselves. The press agreed: the BBC called it "startling", NME "mesmeric", whilst a 4/5 review in The Guardian said it "drags you straight in."

Another stretch of touring followed and by the time the European festival season came round, and after a successful appearance at SXSW in Texas (Elle US described them as the best new act at the festival), Chew Lips were on top of their game. Topping off their tour they headlined the packed BBC Introducing Stage at Glastonbury Festival.

Other touring highlights include support slots with The Killers, Delphic, We Are Scientists, The Virgins, Joy Formidable, Howling Bells, three sold out UK tours and a sold out European tour in 2011.

 Split 
Huertas announced on Twitter in 2015 that she was now only writing material for other artists, implying that Chew Lips had disbanded.

Discography
Studio albums

Singles and EPs

Chew Lips remixing
Bernard Sumner, Hot Chip and Hot City – Didn't Know What Love Was
Party Horse – Lazer Beam
Tape The Radio – Stay Inside
Amanda Blank – Make It Take It
Plastiscines – Barcelona
The Brute Chorus – Heaven

Chew Lips remixes
Solo
David E Sugar
Tepr (Yelle)

Salt Air
Alex Kapranos
Dekker & Johan
Jupiter
Plastician
Two Door Cinema Club

Play Together
WaWa

Karen
Analogue People in a Digital World
Mark Otten
Netsky
We Are Enfant Terrible

Slick
FC Kahuna

Soundtracks and syncsPretty Little Liars (US TV series)The Vampire Diaries (US TV series)
MTV (Various)Paris Connections (UK film)Skins (UK TV series)Made in Chelsea (UK TV series)

Live appearances
UK highlights
Glastonbury Festival
The Great Escape Festival
Wakestock
Latitude Festival
Lovebox Festival
Secret Garden Party
Truck Festival
Kendal Calling
Standon Calling
Rip Curl Boardmasters Festival
Jersey Live
Bestival

United States
SXSW

European festivals
Electric Picnic
London Calling Festival, the Netherlands
Les InRocks Festival & Ground Zero Festival, France
Dockville Festival, Germany
Paredes de Coura Festival, Portugal
Gjon Sports Dome, Spain
Cupola Festival, Switzerland
Summer Well Festival, Romania
Bažant Pohoda Festival, Slovakia
Off Festival gości Electronic Beats, Poland

Press
Unicorn"4/5 – an accomplished first offering" – Q"4/5 – sharp-edged, sharp-witted electro rock...success looks like an open goal" – Mojo"4/5 – a spine tinglingly awesome debut" – Time Out"4.5/5 – it deserves to be massive...make it so" – The Fly"4/5 – brilliant...a record that gets better over time" – MusicOMH"4/5 – Synth heaven!" New!"Beautiful...clattering electronic pop with big melodies" – The Independent"Wistful, discoid confections... like Blondie backed by Simian Mobile Disco" – The Observer"A band to look out for this year… absolutely superb" – Sunday Mail"Our new favourite" – NME"An utterly peerless work; ten tracks to completely lose yourself in" – NME.com"Catchy electro tunes...you'll love 'em" – Grazia"Unicorn is that rarest of things; a record imbued with genuine talent and emotion which wipes the floor with the majority of its makers' contemporaries... quite startling" – BBC"Chew Lips confidently reveal their crossover potential... the rhythms are edgy and the songwriting is something you can really get your teeth into" – Metro"Chew Lips' blending of electronic punk ala 'Yeah Yeah Yeahs go 8-bit' is so infective it's dangerous"'' – Super Super

References

External links

English electronic music duos
English pop music duos
English dance music groups
Kitsuné artists